Marie Margaret Hoesly (November 5, 1916 – September 30, 2003) was an American artistic gymnast. She competed at the 1952 Summer Olympics.

References

1916 births
2003 deaths
American female artistic gymnasts
Gymnasts at the 1952 Summer Olympics
Olympic gymnasts of the United States
20th-century American women
21st-century American women